This is a list of infrared topics.

A
 ADONIS: ADaptive Optics Near Infrared System
 ALICE (accelerator)
 Accretion disc
 Advanced Tactical Airborne Reconnaissance System
 Afocal system
 Air-to-air missile
 Anti-ship missile
 Applied spectroscopy
 Atmospheric Infrared Sounder

B
 Bipolar outflow
 Blackbody infrared radiative dissociation
 Black silicon
 Blue Sky navigation pod

C
 Calorescence
 Camera trap
 Capnography
 Carbon dioxide sensor
 Ceramic heater
 Charge-coupled device
 Chemical imaging
 Chemical laser
 Circular dichroism
 Circumstellar dust
 Civil Aircraft Missile Protection System
 Cloud albedo
 Cloud feedback
 Cold shield
 Color confinement
 Combat Identification Panel
 Common Infrared Countermeasures program
 Computed tomography laser mammography
 Conveyor belt furnace
 Cooled infrared detector
 Coreshine
 Cosmic background radiation
 Cosmic dust
 Cutoff (physics), infrared cutoff

D
 Dangerously irrelevant operator
 Dark nebula
 Dazzler (weapon)
 Dichroic filter
 Diffuse Infrared Background Experiment
 Digital ICE
 Digital infrared thermal imaging in health care
 Disco ball
 Draper point
 Driver's vision enhancer
 Driver Monitoring System

E
 Electric eye
 Electromagnetic spectrum
 Electro-optical MASINT
 Event-related optical signal
 Exozodiacal dust

F
 Fast INfrared Exoplanet Spectroscopy Survey Explorer
 Femtolab
 Fiber focus infrared soldering
 Filter (optics)
 Forward looking infrared
 Free-space optical communication
 Functional near-infrared imaging

G
 Galileo (spacecraft)
 Gamma-Ray Burst Optical/Near-Infrared Detector
 Gas detector
 Gas laser
 Glow stick
 Greenhouse
 Greenhouse effect

H
 H band (infrared)
 HDRi (data format)
 Headlamp
 Heat therapy
 Hot mirror

I
 Infra-red search and track
 Infrared
 Infrared Astronomy
 Infrared beam
 Infrared blaster
 Infrared camera
 Infrared cirrus
 Infrared cleaning
 Infrared countermeasure
 Infrared cut-off filter
 Infrared dark cloud
 Infrared Data Association
 Infrared Data Transmission
 Infrared decoy flare
 Infrared detector
 Infrared divergence
 Infrared dye
 Infrared excess
 Infrared fixed point
 Infrared gas analyzer
 Infrared grill
 Infrared heater
 Infrared homing
 Infrared horizon-scanning
 Infrared interactance
 Infrared lamp
 Infrared laser
 Infrared light
 Infrared mammography]
 Infrared microscopy
 Infrared multiphoton dissociation
 Infrared open-path detector
 Infrared photography
 Infrared Physics and Technology
 Infrared point sensor
 Infrared Processing and Analysis Center
 Infrared reflective coating
 Infrared remote sensing
 Infrared sauna
 Infrared sensing in snakes
 Infrared sensing in vampire bats
 Infrared sensor
 Infrared Sightings
 Infrared signature
 Infrared slavery
 Infrared smoke
 Infrared soldering
 Infrared sources
 Infrared spectroscopy
 Infrared spectroscopy correlation table
 Infrared stealth
 Infrared telescope
 Infrared Telescope in Space
 Infrared vision
 Infrared window
 Interlock (engineering)
 Interplanetary dust cloud
 Intervalence charge transfer
 Ionic crystal
 Iris recognition

J
 J band (infrared)

K
 K band (infrared)
 Kodak High-Speed Infrared

L
 L band (infrared)
 LaserSoft Imaging
 Laser Ablation Electrospray Ionization
 Laser pointer
 Lazer Tag
 LIDAR detector
 Light gun
 Linux infrared remote control
 List of largest infrared telescopes
 List of astronomical interferometers at visible and infrared wavelengths
 Littoral Airborne Sensor/Hyperspectral
 Loreal pit
 Low Altitude Navigation and Targeting Infrared for Night
 Luminous infrared galaxy
 Lyman-break galaxy

M
 MPB mine
 Man-portable air-defense systems
 Mercury cadmium telluride
 Metamaterial cloaking #Invisibility cloaking at infrared frequencies
 Meteosat visible and infrared imager
 Mid-Infrared Advanced Chemical Laser
 Minimum resolvable temperature difference
 Mistral (missile)
 Mobile Infrared Transmitter
 Modulation transfer function (infrared imaging)
 Molecular cloud
 Molecular vibration

N
 Nancy Grace Roman Space Telescope
 Nanoshell
 Near Field Infrared Experiment
 Near Infrared Camera and Multi-Object Spectrometer
 Near-Infrared Mapping Spectrometer
 Near-infrared signature management technology
 Near-infrared spectroscopy
 Near-infrared window in biological tissue
 Negative luminescence
 Net radiometer
 Non-ionizing radiation
 Nondispersive infrared sensor

O
 OH-Suppressing Infrared Integral Field Spectrograph
 Optical, Spectroscopic, and Infrared Remote Imaging System (OSIRIS)
 Optical properties of water and ice
 Optical window
 Opto-isolator
 Outgoing longwave radiation

P
 PASS device
 Photometer
 Photon upconversion
 Photosynthetically active radiation
 Photothermal therapy
 Planetary Fourier Spectrometer
 Polariton
 Projection keyboard

Q
 Quantum cascade laser

R
 RAPTOR
 Radiative flux
 Raman spectroscopy
 Reststrahlen effect
 RIAS (Remote Infrared Audible Signage)
 Roboraptor

S
 Shiva laser
 Signal transfer function
 Slide projector
 Soft-collinear effective theory
 Solar gain
 Space-Based Infrared System
 Space-Based Infrared Systems Wing
 Spitzer Infrared Nearby Galaxies Survey
 SPRITE infrared detector
 Stratoscope
 Stratospheric Observatory for Infrared Astronomy
 Structured light
 Super Scope
 Super black
 Surface plasmon polaritons
 Susceptor

T
 Tail-chase engagement
 Television Infrared Observation Satellite
 The Infra-Red Traffic Logger
 Thermal Emission Spectrometer
 Thermal emittance
 Thermal imaging camera (firefighting)
 Thermal infrared spectroscopy
 Thermofax
 Thermographic camera
 Thermophotovoltaic
 Thermopile
 TrackIR
 Transferability (chemistry)
 Transparency and translucency
 Trombe wall
 Tropical Rainfall Measuring Mission
 Tropospheric Emission Spectrometer
 Two-dimensional infrared spectroscopy
 Two-Micron Sky Survey

U
 UKIRT Infrared Deep Sky Survey
 Unidentified Infrared Emission (UIE)

V
 Van der Waals molecule
 Vertical-external-cavity surface-emitting-laser
 Vibrational circular dichroism
 Vibronic transition
 Visible and near-infrared
 Visible and Infrared Survey Telescope for Astronomy

W
 Wood's glass

X

Y

Z

Infrared technology
Infrared
Infrared